The 2023 Tour of Britain is a men's professional road cycling stage race. It will be the nineteenth running of the modern version of the Tour of Britain and the 82nd British tour in total. The race is part of the 2023 UCI ProSeries.

The Tour of Britain starts on 3 September in Manchester and the final stage will finish in Wales on the 10th.

References

External links
 Official website

Tour of Britain
2023
Tour of Britain
Tour of Britain
Tour of Britain